Scindian is widely considered the first convict ship to transport convicts to Western Australia. She was launched in 1844 and sank in 1880.

Career
Scindian was constructed at Sunderland, England, in 1844 and named after the Indian Scindia dynasty. She appeared in Lloyd's Register (LR) in 1844 with J.Terry, master, J. Allan, owner, and trade London-India. Lloyd's Register for 1850 showed her master as J. Cammell. Her owner was still Allan, but her trade was simply given as "London".

Scindian was driven ashore at the Cape of Good Hope, Cape Colony before 23 June 1849. She was refloated with the assistance of the steamship Phoenix.

Scindian left Portsmouth on 4 March 1850 under the command of Captain James Cammell and surgeon-superintendent John Gibson, and docked at Fremantle on 1 June 1850 after a voyage of 89 days. The vessel carried 275 people to Western Australia including 75 male convicts and 163 military pensioners. All the convicts survived the voyage. Among the passengers were a number of officials including Comptroller General of Convicts Edmund Henderson and Superintendent of Convicts Thomas Hill Dixon. Also on board was 10-year-old George Throssell, a son of a pensioner, who later became the second Premier of Western Australia.

The arrival of the convicts was a surprise to many of the Swan River Colony settlers, as Western Australia had petitioned for convicts but had not yet received a reply when Scindian arrived. As no preparations had been made for their arrival, the colony had no jail capable of housing so many convicts. This had been anticipated, and only convicts with a record of good behaviour had been sent. The convicts were initially housed in the warehouse premises of the harbourmaster, which is now the Esplanade Hotel. Shortly after the arrival, work began on the building of a Convict Establishment prison, now Fremantle Prison. After the pensioners arrived, the governor of the colony inducted 100 of them into an armed constabulary force; one of their first tasks was building the prison.

Fate
Scindian sank off the cost of Rio Marina, Elba, Italy on 3 November 1880. Captain Lawrenson and five other men drowned; eight crewmen were rescued.

List of Scindian passengers
Scindian is widely considered the first convict ship to arrive in Western Australia, because she was the first to arrive after Western Australia became a penal colony. A number of ships did bring Parkhurst apprentices to Western Australia between 1842 and 1849, and while these were not considered convict ships by the Western Australian authorities, they were classified as such in English records.

Passengers on Scindian included Thomas Hill Dixon, Edmund Henderson and George Throssell. A full list is provided below.

Convicts

Pensioner guards

Other passengers

Citations and references
Citations

References

Convict ships to Western Australia
Individual sailing vessels
Shipwrecks in the Mediterranean Sea
Shipwrecks of Italy
Maritime incidents in November 1880
1844 ships